is a city located in Niigata Prefecture, Japan. , the city had an estimated population of 41,204 in 14,417 households, and a population density of 214 persons per km2.

Geography

Agano is located in an inland region of north-central Niigata Prefecture. As the city name implies, the Agano River flows through the west side of the city. The highest elevation is the summit of Mount Gozu at 912 meters. Approximately one third of the city area is covered in mountains and forests, and slightly over one third is farmland.

Surrounding municipalities
Niigata Prefecture
Kita-ku, Niigata
Kōnan-ku, Niigata
Akiha-ku, Niigata
Shibata
Gosen
Aga
Tagami

Climate
Agano has a Humid climate (Köppen Cfa) characterized by warm, wet summers and cold winters with heavy snowfall.  The average annual temperature in Agano is 13.2 °C. The average annual rainfall is 1874 mm with September as the wettest month. The temperatures are highest on average in August, at around 24.6 °C, and lowest in January, at around 1.4 °C.

Demographics
Per Japanese census data, the population of Agano was relatively stable throughout the late 20th century but has declined in the 21st.

History

The area of present-day Agano was part of ancient Echigo Province. During the Edo period the area was divided between territories controlled by Shibata Domain, Murakami Domain and tenryō territory held directly by the Tokugawa shogunate. The area was organised as part of Kitakanbara District, Niigata following the Meiji restoration, and the town of Suibara and villages of Yasuda, Kyōgase and Sasakami were established with the creation of the modern municipalities system on April 1, 1889. Yasuda was raised to town status in 1960. The city of Agano was established on April 1, 2004, with the merger of these four municipalities.

Economy

The economy of Agano is dominated by agriculture, including livestock production and cut flowers, but paddy rice remains the dominant crop. In the manufacturing industry, the city has factories for the production of computer related parts manufacturing, food processing, furniture, ceramics and stone products.

Government

Agano has a mayor-council form of government with a directly elected mayor and a unicameral city legislature of 20 members.

Education
Agano has eleven public elementary schools and four public junior high schools operated by the city government. There is one public high school operated by the Niigata Prefectural Board of Education. The prefecture also operates one special education school.

Transportation

Railway
 JR East –  Uetsu Main Line
  –  –

Highway
  – Yasuda IC

Local attractions
 Lake Hyōko (Ramsar site)
 Mount Gozu

Local foods
 : mochi dango balls filled with red bean paste, seasoned with mugwort and wrapped in bamboo leaves.
 : steamed bread flavored with brown sugar.

Notable people from Agano, Niigata
 Bunji Miura, Japanese painter
 Eishiro Saito, Japanese businessman
 Kazuyuki Sekiguchi, Japanese musician and bassist (Southern All Stars)
 Tomoaki Seino, Japanese former football player

References

External links

Official Website 
Agano City Tourism Association's Official Website 

 
Cities in Niigata Prefecture